Oxoniensis is a Latin adjective derived from Oxonia, the Latin name of Oxford, meaning "relating to Oxford, Oxonian“ and may refer to:

 Universitas Oxoniensis, see University of Oxford
 Editio Oxoniensis, a critical edition of a Greek or Latin text in the Oxford Classical Texts series
 Alumni Oxonienses, a biographical directory of University of Oxford alumni

de:Oxoniensis